The 1979–80 Irish Cup was the 100th edition of Northern Ireland's premier football knock-out cup competition. It began on 2 February 1980, and concluded on 26 April 1980 with the final.

The defending champions were Cliftonville, after they had won the cup for the 8th time the previous season, defeating Portadown 3–2 in the 1978–79 final. However, Portadown gained revenge by knocking the holders out in the first round with a 2–1 win. Linfield won the cup for the 32nd time, defeating Crusaders 2–0 in the final.

Results

First round

|}

1This tie required a replay, after the first game ended as a 1–1 draw.
2This tie required two replays, after the first games ended as 1–1 and 0–0 draws.

Quarter-finals

|}

3This tie required a replay, after the first game ended as a 0–0 draw.
4This tie required two replays, after the first games ended as 1–1 and 0–0 draws.

Semi-finals

|}

5This tie required a replay, after the first game ended as a 1–1 draw.

Final

References

Irish Cup seasons
2
Northern Ireland